Augustus Alexandria Chapman (March 9, 1805 – June 7, 1876) was a 19th-century politician and lawyer from Virginia.  Chapman served several terms in the Virginia House of Delegates, as well as one term in the United States House of Representatives.  He was also elected to the Virginia Constitutional Convention of 1850.

Early life
Born in Union, Virginia (now West Virginia), Chapman studied law as a young adult, graduating with a Bachelor of Laws from the University of Virginia in 1827.

Career
He was admitted to the bar in 1825 and commenced practice in Union, Virginia.

About 1829, Chapman settled in Monroe County, Virginia. He was a member of the Virginia House of Delegates from 1835 to 1841.

Chapman was later elected a Democrat to the United States House of Representatives, serving two terms from 1843 to 1847.

Chapman was a member of the Virginia Constitutional Convention from 1850 to 1851 and later returned to the House of Delegates from 1857 to 1861.

At the outbreak of the Civil War, Chapman became a brigadier general of the Virginia Militia and as such took the field with his command in 1861. He was in charge of the 19th Brigade, which consisted of six regiments from Raleigh, Mercer, Fayette, Monroe, and Giles counties.

Later life
After the war, he resumed practicing law in his hometown and engaged in agricultural pursuits.

Death
Augustus Alexandria Chapman died on June 7, 1876, in Hinton, West Virginia. He is interred at Green Hill Cemetery in Union, West Virginia.

See also

List of American Civil War generals (Acting Confederate)

References

Bibliography

External links
 Retrieved on 2008-08-12

Augustus A. Chapman at The Political Graveyard
Chapman House, Historical Marker Database

1805 births
1876 deaths
19th-century American lawyers
Democratic Party members of the Virginia House of Delegates
Virginia lawyers
Confederate militia generals
People of Virginia in the American Civil War
People from Union, West Virginia
West Virginia lawyers
People of West Virginia in the American Civil War
Farmers from West Virginia
People from Hinton, West Virginia
Democratic Party members of the United States House of Representatives from Virginia
19th-century American politicians